Acrolepia kasyi is a moth of the family Acrolepiidae. It was described by Reinhard Gaedike in 1968. It is found in Afghanistan.

References

Moths described in 1968
Acrolepiidae